Cowdray House consists of the ruins of one of England's great Tudor houses, architecturally comparable to many of the great palaces and country houses of that time. It is situated in the Parish of Easebourne, just east of Midhurst, West Sussex standing on the north bank of the River Rother. It was largely destroyed by fire on 24 September 1793, but the ruins have nevertheless been Grade I listed.

Manor House 
The original fortified manor house was built between 1273 and 1284 by Sir John Bohun across the river from the town of Midhurst. He named it Coudreye, the Norman word for the nearby hazel woods.

16th century 

In the 1520s, Sir David Owen, uncle to Henry VII, began construction of the current Cowdray House on the site of the former home Coudreye, which he had acquired upon the death of his wife Mary Bohun in 1496.

In 1529, Sir David's son, Henry, sold the estate of Cowdray to Sir William Fitzwilliam. In 1533 Henry VIII granted a licence to Fitzwilliam's trustees to inpark  of meadow, pasture and wood and build fortifications at "Cowdry".

In 1536, following the Dissolution of the Monasteries, Sir William was given the nearby Easebourne Priory and other properties, whilst in 1538 his half-brother and heir who later inherited Cowdray, Anthony Browne, received Battle Abbey. It is rumoured that a dispossessed monk from Battle cursed the family and house by fire and water, thy line shall come to an end and it shall perish out of this land.

Henry VIII made three visits to the house during his reign, in August 1538, July 1539 and August 1545. Mary of Guise, widow of James V of Scotland, stayed a night at Cowdray in October 1551. The house was also visited by Edward VI in July 1552 and by his sister Elizabeth I in August 1591. The speeches and entertainments for Elizabeth were printed later in the year.

In November 1538, the last surviving member of the House of Plantagenet, Lady Margaret Pole, 8th Countess of Salisbury, was imprisoned at Cowdray until September 1539. She was the niece of Richard III, the last Plantagenet King who died at Bosworth Field in 1485.  She was removed to the Tower of London, and was executed in May 1541.

In 1548, Anthony Browne's son, Sir Anthony Browne inherited Cowdray; he was later ennobled as the 1st Viscount Montague upon the marriage of Queen Mary I to King Philip of Spain.

Henry Wriothesley, third earl of Southampton (1573–1624), courtier and literary patron, was born at Cowdray House near Midhurst in Sussex on 6 October 1573. He was the third child and only surviving son of Henry Wriothesley, 2nd Earl of Southampton, and his wife, Mary Browne, daughter of the first Viscount Montagu. Wriothesley is famous as the dedicatee of Shakespeare's Venus and Adonis and The Rape of Lucrece, and the likely inspiration for the 'fair youth' of Shakespeare's Sonnets.

17th century 

In 1592, the 1st Viscount's grandson Anthony-Maria Browne inherited Cowdray. During his ownership of Cowdray, Guy Fawkes was briefly employed as a footman and the 2nd Viscount was briefly imprisoned for complicity in the Gunpowder plot after staying away from Parliament on 5 November 1605 following a warning.

In the mid-1630s, Robert May was employed as a cook at Cowdray House.

During the English Civil War, two-thirds of the Cowdray estate were sequestered from Francis Browne, 3rd Viscount Montagu, and the house was garrisoned by Parliamentary forces. There are marks on the walls of the main courtyard of the house thought to be from musketballs fired by soldiers during this time.

18th century 

In 1770, under the ownership of the 7th Viscount Montague, Capability Brown was employed to modernise the gardens.

On 24 September 1793, during restoration work, a fire started in the carpenters' workshop in the North Gallery where some smouldering charcoal was allowed to fall upon the sawdust and woodshavings strewn across the floor. During the restoration work the family's furniture and treasures had also been stored in the North Gallery to make re-decorating easier. From the collection only three paintings and a few small pieces of furniture were saved, the rest including artefacts from Battle Abbey being devoured by flames.

Less than two weeks later, the 8th Viscount Montague perished whilst trying to ride the Rhine Falls and the title passed to a descendant of the 2nd Viscount, Mark Browne who later died childless and the peerage became extinct. These two events marked the conclusion of the supposed curse set upon the family 250 years earlier. The estate was inherited by the 8th Viscount's sister and by marriage William Stephen Poyntz.

19th and 20th centuries 

During the early 19th century, the house was left to ruin; it was quickly colonised by plants, most notably ivy, which hastened its decay. Small alterations were made to the surviving Kitchen Tower such as a floor being put in above the kitchens, though it was not inhabited. Following the death of William Poyntz, the estate passed to his three daughters, but they could not decide how to divide the estate and it was eventually sold to the 6th Earl of Egmont in 1843.

In 1908, the 8th Earl of Egmont sold the estate to Sir Weetman Dickinson Pearson, becoming Baron Cowdray of Midhurst and later in 1917 became the 1st Viscount Cowdray. The Viscount put a halt to the decay, arranging for the careful removal of the ivy, the restoration of any unsafe structures and a full survey of the ruins to be completed.

21st century 
The house remains under the ownership of the Viscount Cowdray, currently residing with the 4th Viscount Cowdray who inherited it in 1995. Following a major preservation/conservation project in 2006, the ruins were opened to visitors on 31 March 2007.

Cowdray House featured largely in Anya Seton's 1972 historical romance Green Darkness.

See also 
Cowdray Park, West Sussex, the nearby replacement house.

References 
Citations

Sources

Further reading

External links 
 
 

Country houses in West Sussex
Ruins in West Sussex
Tudor architecture
Historic house museums in West Sussex
Grade I listed buildings in West Sussex